The list of Florida storms from 1950 to 1974 encompasses 85 Atlantic tropical or subtropical cyclones that affected the U.S. state of Florida. Collectively, tropical cyclones in Florida during the time period resulted in about $7.04 billion (2017 USD) in damage, primarily from Hurricanes Donna and Dora. Additionally, tropical cyclones in Florida were directly responsible for 93 fatalities during the period, as well as responsible for 23 indirect deaths. Several tropical cyclones produced over 20 inches (500 mm) of rainfall in the state, including Hurricane Easy which is the highest total during the time period. The 1969 season was the year with the most tropical cyclones affecting the state, with a total of 8 systems. The 1954 and 1967 seasons were the only years during the time period in which a storm did not affect the state.

The strongest hurricane to hit the state during the time period was Hurricane Donna in 1960, which was the 8th strongest hurricane on record to strike the United States. Additionally, Hurricanes Easy, King, Isbell, and Betsy hit the state as major hurricanes.

1950–1959

August 31, 1950– Hurricane Baker strikes near Mobile, Alabama, with the eastern half of its circulation producing moderate damage from strong winds and two tornadoes across the Florida Panhandle. Heavy rainfall and winds also led to some crop damage.
September 5, 1950– Hurricane Easy moves ashore near Cedar Key and later near Tampa Bay as a major hurricane after looping offshore. The hurricane causes locally heavy damage in a sparsely populated area, totaling $3.3 million (1950 USD, $29.5 million 2008 USD). Due to its erratic motion, Easy drops heavy rainfall peaking at 38.7 inches (983 mm) in Yankeetown, which in turn causes 2 indirect deaths from electrocution.
October 18, 1950– Hurricane King makes landfall on Miami as a major hurricane. Its hurricane-force winds blows out the windows of many buildings in downtown Miami, resulting in several injuries. Across the state, the storm causes 3 deaths and heavy damage totaling $27.8 million (1950 USD, $249 million 2008 USD), of which over half occurred in the Miami area.
October 21, 1950– The threat of Hurricane Love results in hurricane evacuations along the western coastline, though dry air in the storm leads to very little effects after it hits near the mouth of the Steinhatchee River.
May 18, 1951– The outer rainbands of Hurricane Able produce light rainfall and high seas along the eastern coastline.
The storm results in $2 million in damage (1951 USD, $17 million 2008 USD), which is the only reported damage in the United States during the year.
February 3, 1952– An off-season tropical storm unofficially named the Groundhog Day tropical storm hits near Cape Sable, producing gusty winds and moderate rainfall.
August 30, 1952– Hurricane Able recurves about 130 miles (210 km) east of the state, with the western portion of its circulation dropping  of precipitation in Jacksonville.
June 6, 1953– Tropical Storm Alice dissipates shortly after moving ashore near Panama City, Florida, producing rainfall which breaks a dry spell in the state.
August 29, 1953– An unnamed tropical storm hits near Fort Myers. While crossing the state it drops moderate precipitation, including  in Palm Beach.
September 20, 1953– The seventh storm of the season hits near Yankeetown, though its impact is unknown.
September 26, 1953– Hurricane Florence moves ashore near Destin, causing rough surf and local flooding. Overall damage is minor, and the hurricane results in 3 injuries but no deaths.
Early October, 1953 – An unnamed tropical storm drops light rainfall across the state.
October 9, 1953– Tropical Storm Hazel strikes Fort Myers, and produces gusty winds and additional rainfall to previously wet conditions. The passage of the storm causes flooding of low-lying areas and some rivers, with the upper region of the St. Johns River experiencing record-setting flooding.
August 21, 1955– Tropical Storm Brenda strikes southeastern Louisiana, with its outer rainbands dropping precipitation along the western Florida Panhandle.
July 6, 1956– A tropical depression moves ashore near Pensacola, resulting in light damage and moderate precipitation.
September 24, 1956– Hurricane Flossy hits near Destin as a minimal hurricane, resulting in gusty winds and high tides reaching . The storm causes light damage and 4 indirect deaths in near Tallahassee from an airplane crash during an evacuation.
October 15, 1956– A quasi-tropical storm makes landfall near Miami and drops moderate to heavy rainfall. The storm causes $3 million in damage (1956 USD, $24 million 2008 USD) and 2 deaths from drowning.
November 1956– Rough surf from Hurricane Greta causes about $1.1 million in damage (1956 USD, $8.7 million 2008 USD) along the eastern coastline, primarily near Jacksonville.
Offshore, rough waves capsize a boat and kill 5, with minimal onshore damage.
September 8, 1957– Tropical Storm Debbie moves ashore along the Florida Panhandle, causing flooding, rainfall, and 4 indirect deaths.
September 4, 1958– Tropical Storm Ella emerges into the Gulf of Mexico after crossing Cuba, with its outer rainbands producing gale-force wind gusts in the Florida Keys. The winds uproots a few trees, though damage is minor.
June 18, 1959– An unnamed tropical depression hits near Tampa Bay and spawns at least two tornadoes, one of which causes heavy damage and many injuries in Miami. High tides and moderate rainfall caused damage, as well, and monetary damage across the state totals $1.5 million (1959 USD, $11.1 million 2008 USD).
Damage is minor.
Damage from the storm is minor, with no deaths and only one injury attributed to Judith.

1960–1969

July 29, 1960– Tropical Storm Brenda hits near Yankeetown, producing locally heavy rainfall which reaches over 13 inches (330 mm) near Tampa. The rainfall causes flooding and a few indirect traffic deaths, and damage in the state totals $5 million (1960 USD, $36 million 2008 USD).
September 10, 1960– Hurricane Donna strikes near Cape Sable after crossing the Florida Keys, and after briefly moving emerging into the Gulf of Mexico makes its final landfall near Fort Myers. It leaves a path of destruction across the entire peninsula, including destroying 30% of the state's grapefruit crop and leveling over half of the mangrove trees in the Everglades. The passage of the hurricane results in 2,156 destroyed homes, 3,903 severely damaged houses, and 281 boats destroyed or left with major damage. Throughout the state, Donna causes over $300 million in damage (1960 USD, $2.19 billion 2008 USD) and 13 direct deaths.
September 15, 1960– Tropical Storm Ethel strikes Mississippi after rapidly weakening from a strong hurricane, and causes light winds and rainfall across western Florida. Damage totals about $250,000 (1960 USD, $1.8 million 2008 USD), primarily from crop damage.
September 23, 1960– Tropical Depression Florence strikes near Chokoloskee, and after turning westward near Vero Beach emerges into the Gulf of Mexico before making a final landfall near Pensacola. The storm drops moderate amounts of rainfall, causing localized but minor amounts of damage.
September 11, 1961– Hurricane Carla strikes Texas, with its outer rainbands dropping light amounts of precipitation across Florida.
August 26, 1962– A tropical depression which later becomes Hurricane Alma brushes the southeastern portion of the state, dropping 3.6 inches (91 mm) of rain at Fort Drum.
October, 1963– Rough surf from Hurricane Flora kills one in Miami.
October 21, 1963– Hurricane Ginny passes about 50 miles (80 km) east of the state before turning northeastward, producing gusty winds, light rainfall, and minor damage.
June 6, 1964– A tropical depression hits near Yankeetown and exits near Jacksonville. The depression produces thunderstorm activity and hail storms across the northern portion of the state, causing about $1 million in damage (1964 USD, $7 million 2008 USD).

Strong winds from the hurricane down many trees and power lines, with moderate to heavy building and crop damage reported near the coast. Rainfall reaches 6.8 inches (173 mm) in Miami, with storm tides peaking at 5.5 feet (1.7 m) in Pompano Beach. Damage in the state amounts to $125 million (1964 USD, $870 million 2008 USD); no deaths are reported in the state.
September 10, 1964– Hurricane Dora makes landfall as a weakening Category 2 hurricane near Jacksonville, the first hurricane in an extended period of time to strike the area. Dora produces moderate to heavy amounts of precipitation which peaks at 23.73 inches (603 mm) in Mayo, causing flooding damage and killing one from drowning. Wind gusts peak at  near St. Augustine, causing massive utility failures and heavy damage to buildings. Two Navy personnel die when their evacuating plane crashed upon takeoff. Damage totaled about $220 million (1964 USD, $1.53 billion 2008 USD).
September 20, 1964– Hurricane Gladys produces rough surf along the eastern Florida coastline.
October 5, 1964– The extratropical remnant of Hurricane Hilda enters the Florida Panhandle, dropping moderately heavy rainfall and producing high tides. One person drowns while surfing near Pensacola.
October 14, 1964– Hurricane Isbell makes landfall near Everglades and drops moderate amounts of precipitation peaking at 9.46 inches (240 mm) in West Palm Beach. The hurricane spawns at least 11 tornadoes and injured at least 50, mostly minor. Throughout the state, the hurricane kills three, of which one indirectly, and causes over $5 million (1964 USD, $35 million 2008 USD) in crop damage.
June 15, 1965– An unnamed tropical storm hits near Panama City, producing high tides and moderate rainfall peaking at 5.99 inches (152 mm) in Tallahassee. Damage from the storm is minor, and no deaths or injuries are reported.

The rainfall provided relief to a water shortage in the Everglades, while strong waves and high tides causes considerable flooding in coastal and low-lying areas in the southeastern portion of the state. The passage of Betsy results in 4 deaths and $139.3 million in damage (1965 USD, $953 million 2008 USD) in the state. Betsy would enter the Gulf of Mexico and cause much greater devastation in southeastern Louisiana, where the storm caused 76 deaths and over $1 billion in damage. 
September 30, 1965– Tropical Storm Debbie dissipates off of the coast of Mississippi and drops 3–5 inches (75–125 mm) of precipitation across the northern region of the state.
June 9, 1966– Hurricane Alma makes landfall near Apalachicola as a Category 2 hurricane after paralleling the western coastline as a major hurricane. Alma causes $10 million in damage (1966 USD, $66 million 2008 USD), 2 direct deaths from drowning, and 4 indirect deaths.
June 30, 1966– A tropical depression forms in the western Caribbean Sea and moves on a track similar to Alma.  The center passed near Key Largo, producing two tornadoes, one of which destroyed two aircraft at Palm Beach International Airport, as well as moderate to heavy rainfall totaling nearly 10 inches (250 mm) at Everglades City and Jacksonville.  The combination of Alma and this tropical depression brought 21.37 inches/542.8 mm to Miami, which established a new June rainfall record for that location.
July 24, 1966– The precursor tropical low to a tropical depression crosses the northern portion of the state; its effects are minimal.
October 4, 1966– Hurricane Inez passes through the Florida Keys, resulting in 3 deaths and $5 million in damage (1966 USD, $33 million 2008 USD). Rainfall in the state peaks at 4.8 inches (122 mm) at Kendall, while offshore the hurricane results in 45 casualties in the Florida Straits.
June 4, 1968– Tropical Storm Abby moves ashore near Punta Gorda, spawning 3 small tornadoes and producing up to 14.2 inches (361 mm) of precipitation at Cocoa. The rainfall is beneficial and ends a severe, persistent drought in the state. The storm causes six indirect deaths in the state.
June 18, 1968– The precursor tropical depression to Hurricane Brenda passes across the eastern portion of the state, dropping moderate precipitation peaking at 8.61 inches (219 mm) in Homestead. No damage is reported.
July 5, 1968– A tropical depression strikes the Florida Panhandle and quickly dissipates, though its impact is unknown.
August 10, 1968– The precursor tropical depression to Hurricane Dolly moves through the eastern portion of the state, producing gusty winds though no known damage.
August 28, 1968– A tropical depression stalls along the western coastline near Tampa before turning to the northeast and crossing the state. It drops heavy rainfall, including 15 inches (381 mm) in Jacksonville, resulting in extensive localized flooding. The depression also spawns a tornado near Daytona Beach which destroys a motel and several houses.

September 26, 1968– A tropical depression crosses the southern portion of the state, though its impact is unknown.
October 19, 1968– Hurricane Gladys makes landfall just north of Tampa Bay, producing moderate rainfall and two tornadoes while crossing the state. Damage totals $6.7 million (1968 USD, $42 million 2008 USD), primarily due to structural damage.
June 9, 1969– A tropical depression dissipates shortly after passing through the Florida Keys. Its effects are unknown.
August 18, 1969– Hurricane Camille strikes southern Mississippi as a Category 5 hurricane, with its large wind field producing a  wind gust and 3.55 inches (90 mm) of rain in Pensacola. The hurricane causes minor crop damage to pecan trees and corn stalks.
August 29, 1969– A tropical depression makes landfall on the east-central portion of the state, though its impact is unknown.
September 7, 1969– The precursor tropical depression to Hurricane Gerda passes over the southeastern portion of the state before turning to the northeast. Its rainfall impact was minimal, as less than three inches (76 mm)  of rain fell across the Sunshine State.
September 21, 1969– A tropical depression moves ashore along the western Florida Panhandle, before stalling. It becomes the wettest known tropical cyclone for the eastern Florida panhandle, when 23.40 inches (594 mm) falls at Havana.
October 1, 1969– Subtropical Depression One hits the western Florida Panhandle. Its effects, if any, are unknown.
October 2, 1969– Tropical Storm Jenny makes landfall near Fort Myers, crosses the state, and approaches the Atlantic Ocean near Cape Canaveral before turning to the west-southwest and exiting into the Gulf of Mexico near Tampa. The storm produces heavy rainfall of 5–8 inches (127–203 mm) across the central region of the state.
October 21, 1969– Hurricane Laurie attains a peak strength of  while moving eastward in the Gulf of Mexico. Its threat prompts officials to issue a gale warning from the Florida Keys to Fort Myers, though Laurie turns to the southwest and does not impact the state.

1970–1974

1970

May 25, 1970– Tropical Depression Alma makes landfall near Yankeetown, producing moderate rainfall of 5–10 inches (127–254 mm) which ends a persistent drought in the southern portion of the state.
July 22, 1970– Tropical Storm Becky hits Apachicola, producing moderate rainfall peaking at over 8 inches (203 mm) in Tallahassee which floods 104 houses and injures two. The storm also spawns a tornado which destroys a house and severely damages three others in Panacea.
August 6, 1970– A tropical depression moves ashore near Cape Canaveral, though its effects, if any, are unknown.
September 13, 1970– The precursor tropical depression to Tropical Storm Felice passes through the Florida Keys, dropping beneficial rainfall to the southern portion of the state.
September 27, 1970– Tropical Storm Greta passes through the Florida Keys as a weakening tropical cyclone, producing tropical storm force wind gusts but no reported damage.

1971
August 10, 1971– A tropical depression which later becomes Hurricane Beth forms near Miami and subsequently tracks northeastward. Its effects in the state, if any, are unknown.
August 13, 1971– A tropical depression strikes Fort Myers, turns to the northwest into the Gulf of Mexico, intensifies as it turned to the northeast, and moves ashore near Steinhatchee. The depression produces hurricane-force wind gusts at Cedar Key and drops rainfall of over 8 inches (203 mm), resulting in some coastal flooding.
August 29, 1971– A tropical depression moves across the southern portion of the state, though its effects are unknown.
September 1, 1971– The mid-level precursor disturbance to Hurricane Fern moves across the central portion of the state, dropping moderate precipitation which reaches over 5 inches (127 mm) near Miami.
September 16, 1971– Hurricane Edith hits southern Louisiana, producing light rainfall and a tornado near Pensacola.
October 13, 1971– A tropical depression moves ashore near Apalachicola, though its effects are unknown.

1972
May 28, 1972– Subtropical Storm Alpha makes landfall near Brunswick, Georgia and turns southwestward across northern Florida, dropping light rainfall across its path but causing no damage.

June 19, 1972– Hurricane Agnes strikes Panama City with minimal hurricane-force winds and a storm surge peaking at 7 feet (2.1 m) in Cedar Key. Agnes produces moderate rainfall throughout the state, amounting to a maximum of 8.97 inches (228 mm) in Naples. The hurricane spawns 28 tornadoes in the state which destroy 15 houses and 217 trailers. Throughout the state, Agnes causes $8.2 million in damage (1972 USD, $42 million 2008 USD) and nine deaths, seven of which are from the tornadoes.
September 5, 1972– The tropical depression that later becomes Hurricane Dawn briefly passes over southeastern Florida before turning northeastward.

1973
June 7, 1973– A tropical depression develops over the southeastern portion of the state, and briefly enters the Gulf of Mexico before hitting St. Marks. Its effects are unknown.
June 23, 1973– An area of disturbed weather forms into a tropical depression over the northern portion of the state and subsequently tracks to the northeast.
September 3, 1973– A tropical depression intensifies into Tropical Storm Delia over the open Gulf of Mexico, producing light rain across Florida before striking Texas.
September 25, 1973– Jacksonville is struck by a tropical depression, though its effects, if any, are unknown.

1974
June 25, 1974– The combination of Subtropical Storm One, which struck Tampa, and a tropical depression to its southwest, produce slightly above normal tides and heavy rainfall reaching 20 inches (508 mm) near Tampa Bay.  The passage of these systems cause three fatalities from drowning and $10 million in damage (1974 USD, $44 million 2008 USD) from tidal and rainfall flooding.
September 8, 1974– Hurricane Carmen makes landfall on southern Louisiana, with its outer rainbands producing precipitation across the state that reaches over 10 inches (254 mm) in the extreme northwestern portion of the state.
September 27, 1974– A tropical depression dissipates shortly after moving ashore near Cedar Key and causes no known effects.
October 7, 1974– Subtropical Storm Four passes just offshore the eastern coastline and produces some beach erosion and localized flooding from rainfall peaking at 14 inches (356 mm) in Boca Raton.

Monthly statistics

Deadly storms
The following is a list of hurricanes with known deaths in the state.

See also

List of Atlantic hurricanes

References

 1950
1950s in Florida
1960s in Florida
1970s in Florida
Florida 1950
Lists of tropical cyclones in the United States
Hurricanes